Kenje Ogata (June 1, 1919 – January 18, 2012) was one of five documented Nisei to serve in the United States Army Air Corps during World War II.

Early years
Kenje Ogata was born June 1, 1919 in Gary, Indiana, the son of Clay Kamezo and Wai (née Mitsuda) Ogata. As a young man he grew up in Sterling, Illinois, participating in Boy Scouts and graduating in 1936 from Sterling High School. Following his graduation he worked in the plating room of the National Manufacturing Company. Interested in aviation, Ogata earned his pilots license through Civilian Pilots Training Program (CPTP).

World War II
Following the bombing of Pearl Harbor on December 7, 1941, Ogata boarded a train to Chicago, Illinois to join the service. Due to his Japanese heritage he was discouraged from joining the service by those taking enlistments. However, Ogata was determined to join the service telling the recruitment office "I am here to serve". Enlisted and sent through training, Ogata was assigned as a medical corpsman to Camp Grant, Rockford, Illinois. Despite his requests for reassignment, prejudice against those of Japanese heritage remained and his requests were refused. Ogata, unwilling to accept this, enlisted the support of the Sterling community receiving letters of support and recommendation from the town's mayor, police chief, city attorney, and local judges attesting to his character. Eventually the Army would agree and transfer Ogata.

In 1943, Ogata was transferred December 31, 1943 to Army Air Corps and assigned to the 49th Bomb Wing, 451st Bomb Group, 726th Squadron, 15th Air Force in Italy. Consisting of B-24s Ogata trained as a ball turret gunner. While serving with the 451st Bomb Group Ogata would rise to the rank of Staff Sergeant, complete thirty-five missions, and survive two crashes. For his service and injuries sustained in combat he would receive the Air Medal with three bronze oak leaf clusters and the Purple Heart.

References

External link

1919 births
Recipients of the Air Medal
United States Army Air Forces soldiers
United States Army Air Forces personnel of World War II
American military personnel of Japanese descent
2012 deaths
People from Gary, Indiana
People from Sterling, Illinois